Matilde Ribeiro (born July 29, 1960, Flórida Paulista) is a Brazilian social worker and political activist. She was Chief Minister of the SEPPIR in the Lula government. 

Ribeiro has participated in the militant black movement and feminist movement. She graduated in Social Service from Pontifical Catholic University of São Paulo. Born in a low-income family, she is affiliated with the Workers' Party (PT). From 21 March 2003 until 6 February 2008, she served as the Special Secretariat for Policies to Promote Racial Equality (Portuguese: Secretaria de Políticas de Promoção da Igualdade Racial, SEPPIR), which has ministerial status. 

She was in Manaus in April 2005 at the first State Conference for the Promotion of Racial Equality, which was marked by protests of the mestizo movement against the policy of non-recognition of Caboclon identity. In February 2008, she resigned from office, pressured by the media and threatened by the government with dismissal because of irregular expenditures.

References

1960 births
Living people
People from São Paulo (state)
Brazilian civil rights activists
Brazilian feminists
Workers' Party (Brazil) politicians
Brazilian women's rights activists
Brazilian politicians of African descent
Afro-Brazilian feminists
Women civil rights activists